Dou Kalender (born May 28, 1985, as Doğukan Kalender) is a composer, multi-instrumentalist, and vocalist from Istanbul/Turkey. He is known from being the frontman of Ethnical/Symphonic Death Metal band 'KHEPRA'. He has appeared in debut album 'Sons of Earth and Sky' and after the release, he took part at festivals with the band in Georgia, Hungary and Ukraine (Metal Heads Mission).

Khepra's debut album Cosmology Divine released from German Record Label Naturmacht Productions in 10/09/2016. The band released two single's from the album which are called  We are descending and  Obsession of the Mad

After being a fan of Dante Alighieri's Divine Comedy, He started his own Ambient/Symphonic soundtrack project about Dante's Inferno and released 2 songs from his personal SoundCloud account.

Discography

Khepra
 Studio Releases
  Obsession of the Mad (Single) (2016)
  Cosmology Divine (Full Length) (2016)
  Symphony Divine (Full Length) (2018)

Gürz
 Studio Releases
  Sons of Earth and Sky (2012)

Solo Project
  Dante's Inferno (Unknown)

Guest Appearances
Niburta - ReSet (2015) - Session Vocals

References

1985 births
Living people